Per Krafft may refer to:

 Per Krafft the Elder (1724–1793), Swedish portraitist
 Per Krafft the Younger (1777–1863), Swedish painter of portraits and history paintings